The term Zolo can mean:

Zolo, Togo, a small town and canton in Togo
 Roronoa Zoro (spelled Zolo in some English adaptations), a fictional character in the Japanese manga series One Piece
 Colonel Zolo, villain of the 1984 film Romancing the Stone
 Philadelphia Union, a Major League Soccer expansion team commonly known as the Zolos
 Zolo Inc, toy designers, established in 1986.  Makers of ZoLO Playsculptures.

See also
 Zola (disambiguation)